The Tapiola Central Tower (Finnish: Tapiolan keskustorni) is a high-rise building at the centre of the Tapiola garden city in northeastern Espoo, Finland. The tower was designed by architect Aarne Ervi and it was completed in 1961. Construction of the tower started in 1958. The tower was originally known as Konttoritorni ("office tower").

Originally the bottom floors of the tower hosted business spaces, while the top floors hosted offices and bureaus. The twelfth floor hosted restaurant Linnunrata for a long time. The top floor is contracted and hosted panorama restaurant Kultakukko.

The Tapiola Central Tower is coated with enameled steel.

Many scenes in 1960s-era Finnish films where shot at the panorama restaurant of the Tapiola Central Tower.

References

External links
 Pirkko Mannola kotikulmilla Tapiolassa (Pirkko Mannola at her home neighbourhood in Tapiola)
 Sijoittajaa etsitään: Tapiolan maamerkki muuttumassa hotelliksi (Looking for an investor: the Tapiola landmark is changing to a hotel)

Buildings and structures in Espoo
Tapiola